Global Geospace Science (GGS) is a Ongoing NASA spaceprogram operating one satellite:

WIND
And Formally Operated One Satellite:
Polar

External links
 http://www-istp.gsfc.nasa.gov/istp/ggs_project.html

NASA programs
Geospace monitoring satellites
https://www.britannica.com/place/Saturn-planet/The-ring-system